Norman Morris (1849 – 20 January 1874) was an English amateur cricketer who played between 1870 and 1873.

Morris was born at Peckham in Surrey, the son of Norman Morris. He was educated at Tonbridge School in Kent between 1863 and 1868 and then at Jesus College, Cambridge. He played cricket in the school XI for three years and captained the Tonbridge side in his final year at school.

Morris made his first-class cricket debut for Kent County Cricket Club in July 1870 at Gravesend in a match against Yorkshire. He played in 10 matches for the county until the end of 1872 before playing five times for Surrey during 1873. Morris also made appearances for MCC and the Gentlemen of the South in 1873 and played club cricket for MCC and the Gentlemen of Kent.

Morris worked in the London Stock Exchange. He died near Lingfield in Surrey in January 1874 aged 25.

Notes

References

External links

1849 births
1874 deaths
People educated at Tonbridge School
Alumni of Jesus College, Cambridge
English cricketers
Kent cricketers
Surrey cricketers
Gentlemen of the South cricketers
Marylebone Cricket Club cricketers